HSR may refer to:

Biology and medicine
 Health services research
 Heat shock response, via HSPA1A gene
 Homogeneously staining region

Transportation
 Hamilton Street Railway
 High-speed rail
 Higher-speed rail
 Hisar Junction railway station, in India
 Holyoke Street Railway
 Hot Springs Municipal Airport, South Dakota, US
 Mitsubishi HSR, a concept car

Other
 Haliburton Scout Reserve, a Scouts Canada camp
 Hart–Scott–Rodino Antitrust Improvements Act
 Hidden surface removal
 Hierarchical state routing
 High-availability Seamless Redundancy
 Historical Social Research
 Historic Sportscar Racing, U.S.
 Hochschule für Technik Rapperswil, a university in St. Gallen, Switzerland
 HSR Layout, Bengaluru
 High-Speed Research Program, a 1990-1999 NASA supersonic jet program
 Honkai: Star Rail, an upcoming video game developed by HoYoverse